Qaderabad (also Romanized as Qāderābād and Qādirābād) is a city and capital of Mashhad Morghab District, in Khorrambid County, Fars Province, Iran.  At the 2006 census, its population was 14,095, in 3,375 families.

References

Populated places in Khorrambid County

Cities in Fars Province